Mekinley Island (also known as Kui Island) is an island north of Sariba Island, and on the eastern side of China Strait, in Milne Bay Province, Papua New Guinea.

Administration 
The island is part of Sidudu Ward, which belongs to Bwanabwana Rural Local Level Government Area LLG, Samarai-Murua District, which are in Milne Bay Province.

Geography 
The island is part of the Sariba group, itself a part of Samarai Islands of the Louisiade Archipelago. 
It is located 10 meters from South Kui Island

Demographics 
The population of 5 people is living in the northern coast.

Economy 
The islanders, are farmers as opposed to eastern Louisiade Archipelago islanders. they grow Sago, Taro, and Yams for crops.

References

Islands of Milne Bay Province
Louisiade Archipelago